British Commonwealth Forces Korea (BCFK) was the formal name of the British Commonwealth army, naval and air units serving with the United Nations (UN) in the Korean War. BCFK included Australian, British, Canadian, Indian, and New Zealand units. Some Commonwealth units and personnel served with United States and/or other UN formations, which were not part of BCFK.

History
In 1950, Australian units based with the British Commonwealth Occupation Force (BCOF) in Japan were among the first UN personnel to be deployed in South Korea. After the administrative support role of BCOF in Japan to the fighting forces in Korea had been decided in November 1950, the title BCFK appeared. The position of BCFK Commander-in-Chief was always held by Australian Army officers, the first being Lieutenant General Sir Horace Robertson. Liaison between the Commonwealth C-in-C and the UN high command was provided by a subordinate headquarters in Tokyo.

Seven months after BCFK came into being, the Commonwealth armies formed the 1st Commonwealth Division (in July 1951) and British and Canadian Army personnel predominated at the operational level in the Commonwealth land forces. Lieutenant General William Bridgeford took over from Robertson in October 1951, and he was later succeeded by Lieutenant General Henry Wells. Wells was succeeded by Lieutenant General Rudolph Bierwirth in 1954.

The Royal Navy usually had at least one aircraft carrier on station during the war. The Royal Australian Navy provided the carrier HMAS Sydney. The RN, RAN and Royal Canadian Navy also provided many other warships. The Royal New Zealand Navy deployed a number of Loch class frigates throughout the war.

The RN carriers provided the only British fighter planes to take part in the war. On 9 August 1952 a propeller-driven Sea Fury, piloted by Lieutenant Peter Carmichael of No. 802 Squadron, based on HMS Ocean, shot down a MiG-15 jet fighter, becoming one of only a handful of pilots of propeller planes to have shot down a jet.

The only front-line unit from a Commonwealth air force to serve under BCFK was Royal Australian Air Force (RAAF) No. 77 Squadron, which initially flew P-51 Mustang fighters and later converted to Gloster Meteor jets. British and Canadian aircrews also served with the RAAF. The only Royal Air Force contribution was a wing of Short Sunderland flying boats based at Iwakuni in Japan.

See also
 1st Commonwealth Division
KATCOM
 United Nations Memorial Cemetery in Busan, Korea, where a total of 1589 Commonwealth casualties are buried.
Korean War Memorial in London

Footnotes

Further reading

External links

 Lt Col. John C. Blaxland, 2004, The Korean War: Reflections on Shared Australian and Canadian Military Experiences
 Historical Section, General Staff, Army Headquarters, 1956, Canada's Army in Korea: the United Nations Operations, 1950-53, and their Aftermath 
Royal Engineers Museum Royal Engineers and the Cold War (Korean War)
Royal Engineers Museum 
Royal Engineer pictures of the Korean War
 Invasions of Inchon and Wonsan remembered French and English supported operations. Allies provide a unique perspective of naval operation in the Korean War ... 
  EuroKorVet European Korean war Veterans website (non-off)

History of the Commonwealth of Nations
UK
British Commonwealth units and formations
Military units and formations established in 1950
United Nations contingents in Korea
Military units and formations of the United Kingdom in the Korean War
South Korea–United Kingdom relations
Military units and formations of India
British Commonwealth Occupation Force